Vermont is a seaside town in the Western Cape province of South Africa. Located near Cape Town, the town adjoins the settlement of Onrusrivier and is also close to the town of Hermanus. Vermont is nestled between the mountains and the ocean, and has abundant birdlife. There is a salt pan which fills after rains, and is frequented by flamingos. There is also a rock pool, green areas and coastal pathway in Vermont.

Demographics (2011) 

Area: 2.06 km²
Population: 1,992 (491/km²)
Households: 866 (213/km²)

References

Populated places in the Overstrand Local Municipality